Bantiger TV Tower is a 196 metre tall tower used for FM- and TV-transmission at  on the Bantiger mountain, a mountain east of Berne situated in the municipality of Bolligen. The Bantiger TV Tower was built between 1991 and 1996 as replacement of a 100 metres tall radio tower, built in 1954. 
Bantiger TV Tower, which was inaugurated in 1997 has a public observation deck in a height of 33.7 metres. In contrast to most other observation decks on TV towers, there is no elevator for visitors access. The access to the deck goes via a stairway, which is not inside the tower, but in a lattice tower attached to the towers main structure.

See also 
 List of tallest structures in Switzerland
 List of towers

External links 
    
 

Towers completed in 1954
Towers completed in 1996
Observation towers in Switzerland
Buildings and structures in the canton of Bern
20th-century architecture in Switzerland